The Ballerina Ballroom Cinema Of Dreams is a Scottish film festival founded by actress Tilda Swinton. The inaugural event took place in a ballroom in Nairn in the Scottish Highlands between August 15 and 23 2008.

The Origins 
A while ago, on an impulse, a quixotic seizure, Tilda Swinton rented a ballroom in an old Victorian stone building in Nairn in the North East of Scotland, a seaside town where Charlie Chaplin used to holiday and which has a balmy microclimate and vistas across the Moray Firth to the Black Isle, Cromarty and Sutherland.

The ballroom is called the Ballerina. In the 60s and 70s Pink Floyd, The Who and Cream (band) played there. The ballroom in nearby Elgin was called The Red Shoes.

After renting the Ballerina, Swinton took Mark Cousins to see the place – they were making a wee film about being 8½ and falling in love with cinema – and he loved it and so, together, they dreamt up a festival of beanbags on the floor, that would run 8½ days, that would be a 6 out of 10 on the grunge scale, that would serve home-made cakes and fish finger sandwiches, whose tickets would be £3/£2,or free if you took a tray of home-baking, and that would transform the Ballerina into something like a ghost train.

References

External links
 https://web.archive.org/web/20090217025344/http://www.cinemaofdreams.co.uk/forum/
 Facebook Group
 MySpace Page

Film festivals established in 2008
Film festivals in Scotland